Maa Ghanteshwari temple is a temple located in Chiplima which is 30 km from Sambalpur city via NH 6 in Odisha, India as of now. A bridge is constructed (called Chaurpur bridge) at Mundoghat a strategically important place between Sambalpur and Chiplima. As of December 2018, it is fully functional. It has halved the distance between Maa Ghanteswari Temple and Sambalpur.

As the name suggests there are bells everywhere. People offer bells to the goddess Ghanteswari or the Deity of Bells, after fulfillment of their wishes. Many pilgrims from across the state visit the temple. It is known as the 'lighthouse without light', built by the early sailors, for whom the bells served as warning against heavy winds. The special significance of this place lies in the great number of small bells hanging all around.

The Chipilima Hydro Powerplant (CHEP) is located near the temple on the same river bank.

See also
 List of Hindu temples in India

References

External links

  Sambalpur Attractions, Ghanteshwari Temple. Sulekha.com
  Photo of accumulated bells at the entrance to Ganteswari

Hindu temples in Sambalpur district
Tourist attractions in Sambalpur district